"Can't Go for That" is a song by Canadian recording artist Tamia. It was written by Missy Elliott, Brycyn Evans and Roosevelt "Bink" Harrell for her second studio album A Nu Day (2000), featuring main production from the latter with Elliottt and Evans serving as co-producers. Musically, the song includes an interpolation of "I Can't Go For That (No Can Do)" as performed by Hall & Oates.

"Can't Go for That" was released as the album's lead single in 2000 and peaked at number 84 on the US Billboard Hot 100 and 23 on Billboards Hot R&B/Hip-Hop Singles & Tracks chart. The single was remixed by Jonathan Peters. There is another remix version as the album bonus track which features 213 members Nate Dogg, Snoop Dogg and Warren G.

Music video
A music video for "Can't Go for That" was directed by Chris Hafner in the week of July 1, 2000. It was filmed in Los Angeles.

Track listings

Notes
 denotes co-producer
 denotes additional producer

Credits and personnel 
Credits adapted from the liner notes of A Nu Day.

Co-producer – Brycyn Evans, Missy Elliott
Assistant engineer – Edith Luis
Mixing, recording – Bill Importico
Producer – Bink!

Charts

Weekly charts

References

2000 singles
Tamia songs
Songs written by Missy Elliott
2000 songs
Elektra Records singles
Songs written by John Oates
Songs written by Daryl Hall
Songs written by Bink (record producer)
Songs written by Sara Allen